Gagandeep Kaur is an Indian archer. She is the first archer from Punjab to win a medal (bronze) in the Archery women's compound team with Jhano Hansdah and Bhagyabati Chanu, defeating Malaysia. For her unexpected performance, she was even awarded with Rs 2 lakh cash award from Punjab University in Patiala.

References

Indian female archers
Commonwealth Games bronze medallists for India
Sportspeople from Patiala
Sportswomen from Punjab, India
Archers at the 2010 Commonwealth Games
Living people
1994 births
Commonwealth Games medallists in archery
21st-century Indian women
21st-century Indian people
Universiade medalists in archery
Universiade medalists for India
Medalists at the 2011 Summer Universiade
Medallists at the 2010 Commonwealth Games